Amity Township is the name of several townships in the US:

 Amity Township, Livingston County, Illinois
 Amity Township, Page County, Iowa
 Amity Township, Bottineau County, North Dakota
 Amity Township, Berks County, Pennsylvania
 Amity Township, Erie County, Pennsylvania

See also 
Amity (disambiguation)

Township name disambiguation pages